Australia competed at the 2014 Winter Olympics in Sochi, Russia, from 7 to 23 February 2014. Australia's team consisted of 60 athletes competing in 11 sports, which represented the largest Winter Olympics team the country had ever sent.

Medalists

| width="78%" align="left" valign="top" |

| width="22%" align="left" valign="top" |

Alpine skiing 

Australia had five athletes in qualification position.

Biathlon 

Australia was awarded quota spots in biathlon after higher-placed nations decided to forgo their athlete allocations. The full list of biathlon team was announced on 24 January 2014.

Bobsleigh 

Australia had one sled in each of the three events for a total of 6 athletes. Bobsleigh rider Jana Pittman made history for Australia as she became the nation's first female athlete to compete in both Summer and Winter Olympics. She previously competed as a sprinter in track and field at the 2000 and 2004 Summer Olympics.

* – Denotes the driver of each sled

Cross-country skiing 

Australia had four athletes in qualification position.

Distance

Sprint

Figure skating 

Australia had achieved three quota places: Australian skater Chantelle Kerry appealed to the Court of Arbitration for Sport asking that Brooklee Han should not be able to represent Australia, because she did not have federation approval. This appeal was rejected.

Freestyle skiing 

Australia had eighteen athletes in qualification position. The full list of Australian freestyle skiers was officially named on 22 January 2014.

Aerials

Halfpipe

Moguls

Ski cross

Qualification legend: FA – Qualify to medal round; FB – Qualify to consolation round

Slopestyle

Luge 

Australia qualified a place in the men's singles when Alex Ferlazzo finished in the top 38 (with a maximum of three per nation qualifying) during the 2013–14 Luge World Cup.

Short track speed skating 

Based on their performance at World Cup 3 and 4 in November 2013, Australia qualified 1 man (500 m) and 1 woman (1000 m, 1500 m). Pierre Boda qualified to be Australia's male representative by beating Andy Jung in a three race series. Deanna Lockett represented the women.

Men

Women

Qualification legend: ADV – Advanced due to being impeded by another skater; FA – Qualify to medal round; FB – Qualify to consolation round

Skeleton 

Australia had one sled in the men's event and two in the women's for a total of 3 athletes.

Snowboarding 

Australia had thirteen athletes in qualification position.

Freestyle
Men

Qualification Legend: QF – Qualify directly to final; QS – Qualify to semifinal

Women

Qualification Legend: QF – Qualify directly to final; QS – Qualify to semifinal

Snowboard cross

Qualification legend: FA – Qualify to medal final; FB – Qualify to consolation final

Speed skating 

Men

References

External links 

 
 

Nations at the 2014 Winter Olympics
2014
Winter Olympics
Winter sports in Australia